In mathematics, a Tutte–Grothendieck (TG) invariant is a type of graph invariant that satisfies a generalized deletion–contraction formula. Any evaluation of the Tutte polynomial would be an example of a TG invariant.

Definition 
A graph function f is TG-invariant if:

Above G / e denotes edge contraction whereas G \ e denotes deletion. The numbers c, x, y, a, b are parameters.

Generalization to matroids 
The matroid function f is TG if:

 

It can be shown that f is given by:

 

where E is the edge set of M; r is the rank function; and

 

is the generalization of the Tutte polynomial to matroids.

Grothendieck group 
The invariant is named after Alexander Grothendieck because of a similar construction of the Grothendieck group used in the Riemann–Roch theorem. For more details see:

References 

Graph invariants